Ophiuros is a genus of Asia, Australian, and East African plants in the grass family.

 species
 Ophiuros bombaiensis Bor - 	Tamil Nadu, Maharashtra
 Ophiuros exaltatus (L.) Kuntze - Indian Subcontinent, southern China, Southeast Asia, Ryukyu Islands, New Guinea, Australia
 Ophiuros megaphyllus Stapf ex Haines - eastern India, Bangladesh, Bhutan, Myanmar, Thailand
 Ophiuros papillosus Hochst. - Eritrea, Ethiopia, Sudan

 formerly included
see Coelorachis Hainardia Lepturus Mnesithea Parapholis Pholiurus Ratzeburgia Rhytachne Rottboellia Thaumastochloa

References

Andropogoneae
Poaceae genera
Grasses of Africa
Grasses of Asia
Grasses of Oceania